Shukhalata Rao (1886–1969) was an Indian social worker, artist and children's book author. Born in Calcutta in the Bengal province of British India, she was the daughter of Upendrakishore Ray Chowdhury, and sister of Sukumar Ray. She studied in Bethune College, and obtained a bachelor's degree. 

She married Dr. Jayanta Rao from Cuttack. After moving to Cuttack, Shukhalata founded the Shishu-o-Matri Mangal Kendro ('Centre for the Welfare of Children and Mothers'). She also established the Orissa Nari Seva Sangha.

Writings
Shukhalata was the editor of Alok, a newspaper. Her writings include children's stories, and fairy tales. Her books include:

 Galpa-ar-Galpa
 Galper Boi (1912)
 Aro Galpa (1916)
 Khoka Elo Beriye (1916)
 Natun Para (1922)
 Shonar Mayur
 Natun Chhora (1952)
 Bideshi Chora (1962)
 Nanan Desher Rupkatha
 Pather Alo
 Aesoper Golpo
 Living Lights
Nije Pora
Behula

Awards
Shukhalata Rao was given the Kaiser-e-Hind award by the Government of India in 1956 for her book Nije Pora.

References

Bethune College alumni
University of Calcutta alumni
Bengali writers
1886 births
1969 deaths
20th-century women artists
Indian writers
Indian women artists
Indian artists
Indian children's writers
20th-century Indian women artists
20th-century Indian women writers
Indian social workers
Social workers
Indian women children's writers
 Writers from Kolkata
Indian illustrators
Indian women illustrators
Women artists from West Bengal